Bangor Township may refer to:

 Bangor Township, Marshall County, Iowa
 Bangor Township, Bay County, Michigan
 Bangor Township, Van Buren County, Michigan
 Bangor Township, Pope County, Minnesota
 Bangor Township, Brookings County, South Dakota; see Brookings County, South Dakota

See also
 Bangor (disambiguation)

Township name disambiguation pages